The 2012 Big East Conference baseball tournament was held from May 23 to May 27 at Bright House Field in Clearwater, FL. It was an eight-team double elimination tournament.  The winner, St. John's, received the league's automatic bid to the 2012 NCAA Division I baseball tournament.  This marked the Red Storm's seventh tournament championship, the most of any Big East team.

Format and seeding
The top eight teams in the Big East were seeded one through eight based on their regular season finish.  St. John's was the first to clinch a spot in the tournament.

Bracket

All-Tournament Team
The following players were named to the All-Tournament Team

Jack Kaiser Award
Matt Carasiti earned the Jack Kaiser Award for the tournament most outstanding player.  Carasiti, a pitcher for St. John's, earned the win in two of the Red Storm's four games, including the championship game.

References

Tournament
Big East Conference Baseball Tournament
Big East Conference baseball tournament
Big East Conference baseball tournament
College baseball tournaments in Florida
Baseball competitions in Clearwater, Florida